Spencer Trask & Co. is a privately held advanced technology development company.

Members and affiliates of Spencer Trask & Co. are founders of, advisors to, and investors in private and public companies through direct investments and numerous limited liability companies.

Spencer Trask & Co., has been a partner in the formative stage of genomic medicine with Myriad Genetics, healthcare reform with Health Dialog, IP development with Intellectual Ventures, stem cell therapy with Osiris Therapeutics, artificial intelligence with Interos, and crowdfunding with SeedInvest/Circle Internet Financial.

The Internet 
The Chairman of Spencer Trask co-founded Ciena Corp. with the firm started by Gordon Gould — the inventor of the optical amplifier and the laser — and his protégé, Dr. David Huber. Spencer Trask affiliates were the first investors in Ciena.

Ciena popularized the optical amplifier by introducing the first dense wave division multiplexing (WDM) -- an optical communication technology that it is today the common basis of all high-capacity metro, regional and long-distance telecommunications networks in the world and thus a foundation of the Internet.

The optical amplifier is an invention that has been compared in importance to the integrated circuit because it enabled The Information Age.

Legacy 
The firm's namesake is Mr. Spencer A. Trask who financed Thomas Edison and Guglielmo Marconi. Mr. Trask was a founding trustee of the predecessor to General Electric, the president of the world's first electricity firm, Consolidated Edison, and the chairman of The New York Times who hired Adolph Ochs.

References

Further reading 

Spencer Trask Lectures | Public Lectures at Princeton

Financial services companies established in 1982
Companies based in Greenwich, Connecticut
Investment companies of the United States
1982 establishments in Connecticut